Emmanuel Villanis (12 December 1858 - 28 August 1914) was a French sculptor. He was born in Lille, France, and died in Paris.

He studied at the Accademia Albertina in Turin. One of his teachers was Odoardo Tabacchi. From 1885,  Villanis lived in Paris and became one of the most productive sculptors towards the end of the 19th century. His female bronze busts, cast by the Society de Bronze de Paris, were exported all over the world from Paris, particularly to the United States. Today his sculptures can be found regularly in auctions.

References
 Florian Haberey / Pascal Launay: Emmanuel Villanis - Ein Bildhauer der Jahrhundertwende. Weltkunst 71. Jahrg. Nr. 13 (Nov. 2001)
 Pascal Launay et Florian Haberey: Portrait d´artiste: Emmanuel Villanis - sous le signe de la musique. La Gazette de l ´Hôtel Drouot, no 27, 6. juillet 2001, page 12–14. 
 Josje Hortulanus-de Mik: Emmanuel Villanis. , 2002.

External links
  Partial list of works by Villais
 Photographs of his own, some details
 Gallery of photographs of Villanis' works Text in French.
 

1858 births
1914 deaths
Artists from Lille
Accademia Albertina alumni
20th-century French sculptors
19th-century French sculptors
French male sculptors
19th-century French male artists